Armi Ursula Airaksinen-Båveryd (born 22 May 1962) is a former Swedish Olympic swimmer. She competed in the 1980 Summer Olympics, where she swam the 100 m butterfly and the 200 m butterfly.

Clubs
Stockholmspolisens IF

References

1962 births
Living people
Swimmers at the 1980 Summer Olympics
Olympic swimmers of Sweden
Swedish female butterfly swimmers